Kaldirec is an abandoned village in the municipality of Studeničani, North Macedonia.

Demographics
Kaldirec was a newly formed village during the 19th century founded by stockbreeders from surrounding villages. The 1961 Yugoslav census was the last to record any people as residing in the village which contained 40 inhabitants, 35 Albanians and 5 Turks. According to the 2002 census, the village had 0 inhabitants.

References

Villages in Studeničani Municipality
Albanian communities in North Macedonia